Luigi Galli or Giovanni Galli (Latin: Ioannes Aloysius Galli) (died 1657) was a Roman Catholic prelate who served as Bishop of Ancona e Numana (1622–1657) and Apostolic Nuncio to Savoy (1627–1629).

Biography
Galli was born in Osimo, Italy.
On 2 May 1622, he was appointed during the papacy of Pope Gregory XV as Bishop of Ancona e Numana.
On 16 May 1622, he was consecrated bishop by Giulio Savelli, Cardinal-Priest of Santa Sabina, with Marinus Bizzius, Archbishop of Bar, and Giulio Sansedoni, Bishop Emeritus of Grosseto, serving as co-consecrators. 
On 3 Jul 1627, he was appointed during the papacy of Pope Urban VIII as Apostolic Nuncio to Savoy where he served until his resignation on 11 Oct 1629.
He served as Bishop of Ancona e Numana until his death on 22 Jul 1657.

While bishop, he was the principal co-consecrator of Ercole Rangoni, Bishop of Sant'Angelo dei Lombardi e Bisaccia (1622); and Andrea Baroni Peretti, Bishop of Palestrina (1624).

References

External links and additional sources
 (for Chronology of Bishops) 
 (for Chronology of Bishops) 
 (for Chronology of Bishops)  

17th-century Italian Roman Catholic bishops
Bishops appointed by Pope Gregory XV
Bishops appointed by Pope Urban VIII
1657 deaths
Apostolic Nuncios to Savoy